Dr. Raghu Sharma (born 26 July 1958) is an Indian politician from Indian National Congress, who is currently the AICC in-charge of party affairs in Gujarat, Daman and Diu, and Dadra and Nagar Haveli and has served as the Cabinet Minister of Health and Family Welfare, Government of Rajasthan from 2018 to 2021. He is the Member of the Rajasthan Legislative Assembly from Kekri constituency, Ajmer district.

Political career
He is a two time MLA from Kekri constituency. He was a member of parliament from Ajmer Parliamentary Constituency elected in by-election, 2018 as INC candidate. He has also Served as Chief Whip in Rajasthan Legislative Assembly 2008–2013 in Government of Rajasthan. He was appointed AICC in-charge of party affairs in Gujarat, Daman and Diu, and Dadra and Nagar Haveli on 7 October 2021.

Positions Held

Other Positions Held

References

External links 

Living people
1958 births
Rajasthani politicians
People from Ajmer district
India MPs 2014–2019
Lok Sabha members from Rajasthan
Rajasthan MLAs 2008–2013
Indian National Congress politicians from Rajasthan
Rajasthan MLAs 2018–2023